Bala-Chetyrman (Bala Sıtırman) is a rural locality (a selo) and the administrative centre of Bala-Chetyrmansky Selsoviet, Fyodorovsky District, Bashkortostan, Russia. The population was 1,426 as of 2010. There are 14 streets.

Geography 
Bala-Chetyrman is located 23 km southeast of Fyodorovka (the district's administrative centre) by road. Stary Chetyrman is the nearest rural locality.

References 

Rural localities in Fyodorovsky District